National Route 22 is a highway located in Argentina, that connects the provinces of Buenos Aires, La Pampa, Río Negro and Neuquén in . The route starts at the connection with
National Route 3 (Argentina),  at the west of Bahía Blanca and until 2004 the highway end was in Paso de Pino Hachado, on the border with Chile, but currently ends on the connection with National Route 40 (Argentina) in Zapala. The track between Las Lajas and Paso de Pino Hachado is now part of the National Route 242.
The Highway has two lanes, mostly; only the Cipolletti - Plottier track has 4 lanes.

Tourism in Argentina
National roads in Neuquén Province
National roads in Río Negro Province
National roads in La Pampa Province
National roads in Buenos Aires Province